Nimlot (also Namilt, Namlot, Namart, Nemareth, Nemarot, and sometimes Nimrod) was the name of many ancient Egyptians with Libyan ancestry. It is the name of:
Nimlot A, Chief of the Ma, father of pharaoh Shoshenq I of the 22nd Dynasty
Nimlot B, ruler of Herakleopolis, son of Shoshenq I
Nimlot C, High Priest of Amun and ruler of Herakleopolis, son of Osorkon II
Nimlot of Hermopolis or Nimlot D, ruler of Hermopolis during the 25th Dynasty

Ancient Egyptian given names